The R577 is a Regional Route in South Africa.

Route
Its western terminus is the R555 at Roossenekal. It heads east, ending at an intersection with the R540 near Mashishing (Lydenburg).

References

Regional Routes in Mpumalanga